Singair is an upazila of Manikganj District in the Division of Dhaka, Bangladesh.

Geography
It has 44151 households and total area 217.38 km2.

Demographics
As of the 1991 Bangladesh census, Singair has a population of 461628. Males constitute 50.47% of the population, and females 49.53%. This Upazila's eighteen up population is 267789. Singair has an average literacy rate of 21.1% (7+ years), and the national average of 32.4% literate.

Administration
Singair Upazila is divided into Singair Municipality and 11 union parishads: Jamsha, Charigram, Singair, Dhalla, Bayra, Chandhar, Baldahara, Joymontop, Jamirta, Saista, and Talibpur. The union parishads are subdivided into 137 mauzas and 241 villages.

Singair Municipality is subdivided into 9 wards and 14 mahallas.

Education

There are three colleges in the upazila. 

According to Banglapedia, Dakkhin Jamsha High School founded in 1969, Basiruddin Foundation High School (Jamsha Union), Baira High School (1949), Charigram S A Khan High School (1948), Golaidanga High School (1967), Jamirta SG Multilateral High School (1921), Talebpur Adarsho High school  (1973), Joymontop High School (1929), Nabagram Multilateral High School (1921), Shahrail High School (1964), Singair Pilot High School (1940), and Singair Pilot Girl's High School are notable secondary schools.

See also
 Upazilas of Bangladesh
 Districts of Bangladesh
 Divisions of Bangladesh

References

 
Upazilas of Manikganj District